Bandar-e Deyr (also Romanized as Bandar-e Deyyer; also known as Deyyer, Daiyir, Dayer and Qal’eh Dīr) is a city in the Central District of Deyr County, Bushehr province, Iran, and serves as capital of the county. At the 2006 census, its population was 18,454 in 3,882 households. The following census in 2011 counted 20,157 people in 4,890 households. The latest census in 2016 showed a population of 24,087 people in 6,680 households. Bandar-e Deyr was a prominent commercial port in the Persian Gulf, and the Jewish settlers were dominating the local market

Jewish community 
Some historians believe that Dandar Deyr during the 13th century was exclusively inhabited by Jews, in the 19th century Lorimer stated that the population is about 5500 souls, including some Jews. and the Jewish community during the 19th century has an estimated population of 20 to 50 family.

References 

Cities in Bushehr Province
Populated places in Deyr County